Pacific Epping is a shopping centre in Epping, Victoria, a suburb of Melbourne, Australia. It opened in May 1996. Until September 2013, the shopping centre was known as Epping Plaza.

History

Epping Plaza Shopping Centre was officially opened on 29 October 1996 by The Hon. Robert Maclellan, M.L.A.

In November 1997, the dining and entertainment complex opened to the public, with a 10 auditorium Reading Cinemas complex (previously known as Epping 10 Cinema until Reading Cinemas' acquisition of Anderson Multiplex in 2004), Epping Plaza Hotel and indoor restaurants. However, TGI Fridays and La Familigia would not be added to this area until 2001.

In mid-2007, Epping Plaza underwent major extension to the west of the existing plaza and the total number of stores grew to 218.

Further development in 2009 included extension and refurbishment of the Fresh Food Hall, now named "Hunter & Gatherer". The area to the north of Hunter & Gatherer was also refurbished.

Between December 2012 and January 2013, construction commenced on the renovation of the dining and entertainment complex, later known by the time of its completion of the Urban Dining in October 2013, resulting in the removal of the indoor dining area which originally doubled as a shortcut to Reading Cinemas. Stage 5 added 11 restaurants and cafés in a street-style setting on the Cooper Street side of Epping Plaza, in addition to a renovation of Reading Cinemas and many of the surrounding dining and entertainment venues nearby, where Reading Cinemas built two extra auditoriums for Gold Lounge and rebuilt the front side of the interior, as well as a complete rebuild of the exterior itself. The completion of Stage 5 rebranded the shopping centre to Pacific Epping.

in June 2018 QIC assumed Management rights and 50% ownership of the centre.

Quest Apartment Hotels announced in January 2017 that it would build a 96-room hotel that would include an additional 1300sqm of new restaurants at Pacific Epping after securing a lease. Production has completed in late 2018, opening new dining and entertainment complexes to go along with it, further expanding the Urban Diner section.

In 2019, a 2-story childcare centre and gym were built near JB-Hi-Fi and ALDI.

Target closed its store in the centre in early 2021 and was replaced by Kmart.

Tenants 
Major retailers in Pacific Epping include:

 Coles - supermarket
 Woolworths - supermarket
 Aldi - supermarket
 Big W - discount department store
 Kmart - discount department store
 Harris Scarfe - department store
 JB Hi-Fi - consumer goods
 Best & Less - apparel
 Cotton On Mega - apparel
 Reading Cinemas - movie theatres.

Incidents 

On 3 October 2006 a small fire broke out in cinema six of Reading cinemas forcing the evacuation 40 people. Water from fire sprinklers trigged by the blaze also caused damage to the Harris Scarfe department store located below the cinema. Police believe the blaze was deliberately lit.

On 3 December 2008 shoppers and staff at the shopping centre were evacuated after a wall fell five metres inside Big W's garden centre. Police initially feared Big W's northern wall, which was attached to the fallen one, could also collapse, adding  "It was an absolute miracle no one died." The collapse caused Big W, surrounding stores and part of the underground car park to be evacuated and the Big W entrance to the centre to be closed off. It is thought that a burst pipe may have caused the collapse. No one was injured. Police praised the actions of the staff of Big W Epping and Epping Plaza.

One of the first cases of swine flu in Australia unconnected with foreign travel was detected at Epping Plaza. A staff member at McDonald's was diagnosed with swine flu virus, and the McDonald's branch was immediately closed.

See also
 List of shopping centres in Australia

References

External links
 

Shopping centres in Melbourne
Shopping malls established in 1996
Buildings and structures in the City of Whittlesea
1996 establishments in Australia